Mangalam TV is a 24 hours Malayalam satellite news channel headquartered in Thiruvananthapuram, Kerala.

Controversy
On its launch day, Mangalam TV, aired a telephonic audio clip in which Transport Minister AK Saseendran is allegedly heard speaking in a sexually explicit way to a person, whom the channel claimed was a housewife. Saseendran resigned as minister the same day. It was Chief Minister Pinarayi Vijayan who had inaugurated the channel launch.

Later, the channel CEO Ajith Kumar apologised and admitted that it was a sting operation done using a woman journalist of the channel after having denied it earlier.

On April 4, the CEO and four mediapersons of the channel were arrested by the police for airing “obscene conversation” and criminal conspiracy.

Later, Saseendran was acquitted in the case after the complainant, who had earlier alleged sexual harassment turned hostile in court and he returned as minister.

References

Malayalam-language television channels
24-hour television news channels in India
Television channels and stations established in 2017
Television stations in Thiruvananthapuram